Pozzo del Merro is a flooded sinkhole in the countryside northeast of Rome, Italy. Situated at the bottom of an 80 m conical pit, at  it is the second deepest underwater vertical cave in the world. In 2000 two ROVs were sent to explore its depths; the first, the "Mercurio (Mercury)" reached its maximum operative depth of  without reaching the bottom. The second ROV, "Hyball 300", reached  without touching down either.

The sinkhole, similar to the Zacatón cenote, was formed by volcanic activity eroding the carbonate rock.

References

Sinkholes of Italy
Metropolitan City of Rome Capital